is a 2D arcade fighting game developed by Ecole Software and French Bread and published by Sega. The game celebrates the 20th anniversary of ASCII Media Works' Dengeki Bunko imprint, featuring various characters from light novels published under the imprint. The game was first released in Japanese arcades in March 2014, and later released on PlayStation 3 and PlayStation Vita on November 13, 2014. The console version was released in North America and Europe in October 2015. The game's theme song is "Belief" by Mami Kawada.

An updated version of the game, titled , was released in July 2015. The update contains additional characters and more balanced gameplay. The updated version was released on PlayStation 3, PlayStation 4 and PlayStation Vita in December 2015 only in Japan. The updated version's theme song is "ID" by LiSA.

Gameplay
Dengeki Bunko: Fighting Climax is a two-dimensional fighting game, in which two players fight against each using both a playable fighter character and an assist character. Fighting uses three main attack buttons: weak, medium, and strong, along with a support button used for summoning a player's assist character. After an assist character is summoned, players need to rebuild their support gauge before they can summon them again. By building the Climax Gauge with attacks, players can perform powerful Impact Skill attacks, and can also use Blast Icons to perform Blast Attacks, allowing them to escape from combos. The home version features an original story campaign, Dream Duel Story, and online multiplayer, and supports cross-save functionality between the PS3 and Vita versions. Samples from the represented light novel series are also included as unlockable content.

In the Ignition update, it adds another assist character slot, but for Blast only instead of Assist. A new system called Ignition is introduced, giving one character in each team a power-up after each round. From the second round on, if the same Ignition on the team's character from the previous round is reused, it gives an "Extra Ignition".

Character roster
The initial roster features 12 playable characters and 18 assist characters from 22 light novels and the current roster is 19 playable characters and 30 assist characters. The roster features characters under the Dengeki Bunko imprint, among playable characters and assist characters that can be called while in the middle of a round to help the playable character in various ways. All characters are voiced by their respective actors from the anime adaptations, with a few exceptions.

Eight additional characters (four playable and four assists) were added to the roster by mid-2014. The second Sega guests, Selvaria Bles and Alicia Melchiott of Valkyria Chronicles, first appeared in the console ports and later added to the arcade version 1.30, along with other assist characters from other Dengeki Bunko's published series. The games' various stages and their accompanying music tracks are based on other Sega titles, such as Sonic the Hedgehog, Nights into Dreams..., Shinobi, Border Break, Valkyria Chronicles, 7th Dragon and Phantasy Star Online 2. The DLC characters from Sword Art Online, Yuuki and the assist Llenn, were released on December 25, 2015. DLC characters from And you thought there is never a girl online?, Ako and the assist Rusian, was included in a future update.

Playable characters

Assist characters

Other characters

Notes

: Available as extra, post-arcade and console release content.
: Unlockable, but unplayable in Arcade and Dream Duel Modes in original game's console version.
: Akira and Pai were originally non-playable in pre-console release arcade versions of original game.
: Also appears for certain playable characters' Special and Super Moves.
: Introduced in Ignition.
: Both playable and assist characters. If certain playable characters are selected, certain playable characters will instead be assist characters and cannot be selected as the same character who has already been selected from the playable roster in Ignition.
: Downloadable characters in "Ignition".

Reception

Awarding it 4 out of 5, Hardcore Gamer described it as "a love-letter to anime and Sega fans". In contrast, PlayStation Lifestyle awarded it a score of 5.5 out of 10, writing that "although solid enough as a fighting game, the emphasis here is certainly not on gameplay and can often leave newcomers disconnected from the fun." Destructoid said that it "may be too simplistic for most hardcore fighting game fans to enjoy as anything more than an ephemeral lark, but also perhaps still too complex for those that find the genre intimidating."

The PlayStation 3 version of Dengeki Bunko: Fighting Climax sold 34,671 copies within its first week in Japan, placing it at number six on the video game sales chart, while the PlayStation Vita version sold 25,607 copies in the same week, placing it at number nine on the chart.

See also
Dengeki Gakuen RPG: Cross of Venus
Dengeki Bunko: Crossing Void
Under Night In-Birth

Notes

References

External links

2014 video games
ALL.Net games
Arcade video games
Crossover fighting games

Fighting games
French-Bread games
PlayStation 3 games
PlayStation 4 games
PlayStation Vita games
Sega arcade games
Sega video games
Video games based on anime and manga
Video games with 2.5D graphics
Virtua Fighter
Video games scored by Jun Senoue
Video games developed in Japan